Băile may refer to several places in Romania:

 Băile, a village in Balta Albă Commune, Buzău County
Băile 1 Mai and Băile Felix, spas in Sânmartin Commune, Bihor County
Băile Herculane, a town in Caraş-Severin County
Băile Chirui, a village in Lueta Commune, Harghita County
Băile Homorod, a village in Vlăhiţa town, Harghita County
Băile Tuşnad, a town in Harghita County
Băile Borşa, a neighborhood of Borşa town, Maramureș County, and a separate village until 1968
Băile Govora, a town in Vâlcea County
Băile Olăneşti, a town in Vâlcea County
Băile Drânceni, a village in Drânceni Commune, Vaslui County